Roxanne L. James (born 1966) is a Canadian politician who was elected to the House of Commons of Canada in the 2011 election. She represented the electoral district of Scarborough Centre as a member of the Conservative Party, until her defeat in the 42nd federal election on October 19, 2015, which saw her lose her seat to the Liberal Party candidate Salma Zahid.

Her past political history included working on the Defend Marriage campaign, which sought to revoke same-sex couples' right to marry.

Electoral record

References

External links
 

1966 births
Women members of the House of Commons of Canada
Conservative Party of Canada MPs
Living people
Members of the House of Commons of Canada from Ontario
People from Scarborough, Toronto
Politicians from Toronto
Women in Ontario politics
21st-century Canadian politicians
21st-century Canadian women politicians